Yegor Zhuravlyov (born April 12, 1990) is a Russian professional ice hockey defenceman. He is currently playing with Metallurg Magnitogorsk of the Supreme Hockey League (VHL).

Zhuravlyov made his Kontinental Hockey League debut playing with Avtomobilist Yekaterinburg during the 2013–14 KHL season.

References

External links

1990 births
Living people
Amur Khabarovsk players
Avtomobilist Yekaterinburg players
Russian ice hockey defencemen
People from Nizhny Tagil
HC Yugra players
Sportspeople from Sverdlovsk Oblast